United Nations General Assembly Resolution 194 is a resolution adopted near the end of the 1947–1949 Palestine war. The Resolution defines principles for reaching a final settlement and returning Palestine refugees to their homes. Article 11 of the resolution resolves that  The resolution also calls for the establishment of the United Nations Conciliation Commission to facilitate peace between Israel and Arab states, continuing the efforts of UN Mediator Folke Bernadotte, following his assassination.

Of the 58 members of the United Nations at that time, the resolution was adopted by a majority of 35 countries, with 15 voting against and 8 abstaining. The six Arab League countries then represented at the UN, who were also involved in the war, voted against the resolution. The other significant group which voted against comprised the Communist bloc member countries, all of which had already recognized Israel as a de jure state. Israel was not a member of the United Nations at the time, and objected to many of the resolution's articles. Palestinian representatives likewise rejected Resolution 194.

The resolution, especially Article 11, was cited in United Nations General Assembly Resolution 302 establishing the UNRWA and other UN resolutions. It has been argued that the resolution enshrines a right of return for the Palestinian refugees, a claim that Israel disputes.

Background 
During the 1948 Palestine war, around 700,000 Palestinian Arabs or 85% of the total population fled or were expelled from the territory Israel conquered. The UN Mediator for Palestine, Count Folke Bernadotte, believed that the Palestinians displaced had a right to return to their homes and wrote several UN reports to that effect. On June 28, 1948, during a truce he had arranged, he presented a series of suggestions for a peaceful settlement of the Palestine dispute. One of them was that the UN should recognize "the right of residents of Palestine who, because of conditions created by the conflict there have left their normal places of abode, to return to their homes without restriction and to regain possession of their property." Another was to incorporate Jerusalem into Arab territory which angered the Israelis. In the report he presented on September 16, he wrote:

In the report, he argued that "[t]he right of Arab refugees to return to their homes in Jewish-controlled territory at the earliest possible date should be affirmed by the United Nations" and that the UN should supervise payment of "adequate compensation for the property" of those choosing not to return. Israel publicly rejected the report, but Foreign Minister Moshe Sharett acknowledged that "[i]t is not so nice or humanitarian to oppose something which is so basic, so simple: a person's right to return to the home from which he has been driven out by force."

While Bernadotte was assassinated by Jewish paramilitaries, his insistence on a right of return for the refugees formed the basis of resolution 194.

Views 

Several organizations and individuals believe that resolution 194 enshrines a right for the Palestinian refugees to return to their homes in territory that Israel occupied in the 1948 war. The UN General Assembly has reaffirmed Resolution 194 every year since 1949 and other UN resolutions have reaffirmed the right of return, including General Assembly Resolution 169 in 1980.

Joshua Muravchik does not believe that resolution 194 enshrines a right of return, pointing out that the text states that the refugees "should be permitted" to return to their homes at the "earliest practicable date" and this recommendation applies only to those "wishing to... live at peace with their neighbors".

Palestinian and Arab views 
The Arab states originally voted against resolution 194, but they began to reverse their position by spring 1949 and soon became its strongest advocates. The 2002 Arab Peace Initiative softened their stance by calling for "a just solution which must also be accepted by Israel."

Palestinian representatives initially rejected resolution 194 because they viewed it as being based on the illegality of the state of Israel. By their reasoning, Israel had no right to prevent the return of the "indigenous Arab people of Palestine". Later, the Palestinian Liberation Organization (PLO) and other Palestinian organizations has come to view resolution 194 as one source of legal authority for the right of return. In an address in 2009, Palestinian President Mahmoud Abbas stated:

Abbas has on other several occasions referred to a "just solution" to the Palestinian refugees "on the basis of Resolution 194". Hanan Ashrawi, a member of the PLO Executive Committee has similarly declared that resolution 194 enshrines a non-negotiable right of return:

The Palestinian-led BDS movement asserts that Israel must comply with international law by, among other things, "[r]especting, protecting and promoting the rights of Palestinian refugees to return to their homes and properties as stipulated in UN Resolution 194."

Israeli view 

Israel does not believe that it has an obligation to let the refugees return, a view was promulgated by the Israeli leadership even before resolution 194 was adopted. In a cabinet meeting in June 1948 Israel's first Prime Minister, David Ben-Gurion stated: "They [the Palestinians] lost and fled. Their return must now be prevented.... And I will oppose their return also after the war." Ben-Gurion's words were echoed by Prime Minister Yitzhak Shamir who in 1992 declared that the return of the Palestinian refugees "will never happen in any way, shape or form. There is only a Jewish right of return to the land of Israel."

Israel also argued that it did not have to compensate refugees for land and property that they had abandoned. In a press conference in 1949, Sharett stated:

In the debates about UN resolution 273 in 1949 about Israel's admittance to the UN, Israel's UN representative Abba Eban promised that the state would honor its obligations under resolution 181 and resolution 194. El Salvador's representative asked:

Eban replied:

Israel was thus admitted to the United Nations in May 1949 on condition that it "unreservedly accepts the obligations of the UN Charter and undertakes to honour them from the day when it becomes a member of the UN." But Israel didn't comply with the right of return as reaffirmed in resolution 194.

Israel has, however, offered to repatriate refugees as part of negotiations. At the Lausanne Conference Israel offered to repatriate 100,000 refugees in exchange for a comprehensive peace treaty with the Arab states and for annexation of all territories it had captured up until the 1949 Armistice Agreements. The number would have included 50,000 refugees who had already found their way back to their homes in Israel. The offer was quickly withdrawn by Ben-Gurion. Another offer came during the 2000 Camp David negotiations in which Israel offered to allow a maximum of 100,000 refugees to return, on the basis of humanitarian considerations or family reunification.

Polling 
The Palestinian people strongly supports a right of return based on resolution 194. In a 1999 poll by Elia Zureik, some 61.4% of the Palestinians in Israel said that a proper solution to the refugee issue should be based on resolution 194 and about half found such a solution feasible and over 80% of the Palestinians in the occupied Palestinian territories defined applying resolution 194 a just solution to the refugee problem. About 50% of the Palestinians polled thought implementing 194 was feasible. In contrast, less than 5% of Jewish Israeli respondents thought resolution 194 was either just or feasible.

Voting Results 
The result of the voting was the following:

In Favor

Argentina, Australia, Belgium, Brazil, Canada, China, Colombia, Denmark, Dominican Republic, Ecuador, El Salvador, Ethiopia, France, Greece, Haiti, Honduras, Iceland, Liberia, Luxembourg, Netherlands, New Zealand, Nicaragua, Norway, Panama, Paraguay, Peru, Philippines, South Africa, Sweden, Thailand, Turkey, United Kingdom, United States, Uruguay, Venezuela.

Against

Afghanistan, Byelorrusian SSR, Cuba, Czechoslovakia, Egypt, Iraq, Lebanon, Pakistan, Poland, Saudi Arabia, Syria, Ukrainian SSR, USSR, Yemen, Yugoslavia.

Abstaining

Bolivia, Burma, Chile, Costa Rica, Guatemala, India, Iran, Mexico.

Related resolutions 
Adopted in the aftermath of the Six-day war in 1967, Security Council Resolution 237 called upon Israel "to facilitate the return of those inhabitants who have fled the areas [occupied by Israel] since the outbreak of hostilities".

Full text

See also 
 Jewish refugees
 Lausanne Conference of 1949
 List of the UN resolutions concerning Israel
 List of the UN resolutions concerning Palestine
 Palestinian refugees
 United Nations Conciliation Commission
 UNRWA

References

Notes

Citations

Sources 

 
 
 
 
 
 
 
 
 
 
 
 
 
 
 
 
 
 
 
 
 
 
 
 
 

United Nations General Assembly resolutions concerning Israel
0194
1948 in law
Israeli–Palestinian peace process
20th century in Jerusalem
1948 in the United Nations
December 1948 events
1948 Palestinian exodus